It's Not Over  is an album by multiple Grammy and Stellar award winning gospel singer Karen Clark Sheard, released on January 24, 2006. The album peaked at #4 on the Billboard Top Gospel Charts and #124 on the Billboard Top 200. This is Karen Clark Sheard's debut as a solo artist for Word Records, but not her first foray with the label, as she was signed to Word as a member of the Clark Sisters two decades prior to the album's release. Former gospel artist Desmond Pringle was instrumental in signing Sheard to the label. This is the first Sheard album that does not include any guest appearances at all, not even from daughter Kierra "Kiki" Sheard who had appeared on all of Clark-Sheard's previous solo albums to date. However her son, J. Drew Sheard, played drums for all of the live recorded tracks (1-9), as well as producing the closing track.

Track listing

Charts

Awards 

In 2007, the album was nominated for a Dove Award for Contemporary Gospel Album of the Year at the 38th GMA Dove Awards.

References

External links
 
 
 Album Photography Lians : http://www.lmstudios.com

2006 albums
Karen Clark Sheard albums